The Pharcyde  is an American alternative hip hop group, formed in 1989, from South Central Los Angeles. The original four members of the group are Imani (Emandu Wilcox), Slimkid3 (Trevant Hardson), Bootie Brown (Romye Robinson), and Fatlip (Derrick Stewart). DJ Mark Luv was the group's first disc jockey (DJ), followed by producer J-Swift and then J Dilla. The group is perhaps best known for the hit singles "Drop", "Passin' Me By" and "Runnin", as well as their first album, Bizarre Ride II the Pharcyde (1992). The group continues to tour and record, both collaboratively and in solo projects—the most recent being Hardson's collaborative EP with DJ Nu-Mark (of Jurassic 5) released in 2014 on Delicious Vinyl.

History

Early years
Pharcyde group members Slimkid3, Bootie Brown, and Imani met as dancers in the late 1980s and dancing was their main ambition as late as 1990. Around this time, Imani and Slimkid3 were in a group called "As Is" and later a group called the "Play Brothers", while Bootie Brown was a backup dancer for Fatlip (Fatlip being the last member to join the group). Bootie Brown recalls that their earlier dancing careers influenced their rapping – "sometimes the way I rap is almost like the way I used to dance". The group met Reggie Andrews, a local high-school music teacher who worked with the Dazz Band and Rick James, and who was a major musical influence on their debut album. The group also met producer J-Swift around this time, as he was Reggie Andrews's "star pupil" according to the book Check the Technique. Before group settled on the name "The Pharcyde", they were almost called "The Rappers" and "True Jiggaboo", the second of which served as inspiration for their interlude "Jiggaboo Time".

Bizarre Ride II the Pharcyde
The Pharcyde recorded their first demo in 1991, which contained the songs "Passin' Me By", "Ya Mama", and "Officer", and hired a manager, Paul Stewart, who had worked for Cypress Hill, De La Soul, and House of Pain. Mike Ross of Delicious Vinyl heard the demo and the group was signed to the label in the summer of 1991 – they were first featured on Brand New Heavies's album Heavy Rhyme Experience, Vol. 1, on the song "Soul Flower", released by Delicious Vinyl in 1992.

The group, along with producer J-Swift, recorded their first album Bizarre Ride II the Pharcyde, which was released in September 1992. The album was certified Gold by the RIAA in 1996. The album was highly acclaimed, and became one of the most praised and influential alternative hip hop albums of the 1990s.

Their second single "Passin' Me By" became a minor Billboard hit, peaking at No. 52 on the Hot 100. The song was later featured in the hit movie Big Daddy and was also a crossover modern rock hit. The song is now usually considered a golden-era staple and is the group's most well known song. The album featured a couple of guest MCs, including Bucwheed (known then as Buckwheat, formerly of the alternative hip-hop group The Wascals) on the tracks "On The DL" and "I'm That Type of Nigga".

About the group's sense of humor, Imani was quoted in a 1993 interview saying "We find humor in things other people don’t. Everyday situations. People might look at things around here and say, like, ‘Damn!’ We say, ‘Hah, hah, hah.’ We just chill out."

Problems between the group and producer J-Swift began during the recording of the debut, with infighting and "personality conflicts".

After the Bizarre Ride album was released, the group began touring with A Tribe Called Quest and De La Soul, culminating with an appearance at the Lollapalooza show in 1994.

In 1994, Pharcyde appeared on the Red Hot Organization's compilation album, Stolen Moments: Red Hot + Cool. The album, meant to raise awareness and funds in support of the AIDS epidemic in relation to the African American community, was heralded as "Album of the Year" by Time Magazine.

Before the success of Bizarre Ride, the group moved to Inglewood, CA, where they shared a home dubbed the Pharcyde Manor. Lew of DIRT magazine reports of the Manor, "...you can tell their laid-back style meeting rapid-fire rhyme delivery is a product of the virtual telepathic rapport that only comes from eating, sleeping and breathing under the same roof."

Labcabincalifornia
In 1995, The Pharcyde released their second album, Labcabincalifornia. The album received mixed reviews upon release, maybe due to a different musical direction from the light-hearted playfulness of their debut. The album included another big crossover hit, "Runnin", peaking at No. 35 on the Billboard Hot 100. This single was later featured in the movie 8 Mile, as well as the More Music from 8 Mile soundtrack. Labcabincalifornia featured production from producers Jay Dee (who handled the majority of the production). Member Slimkid3 has stated that the group met Jay Dee by way of Q-Tip of A Tribe Called Quest, who handed them the tape that contained some of the production that would end up on the LP. This album generated lower sales, not reaching gold status. A music video for the song "Drop" was directed by Spike Jonze.

Problems grew between Fatlip and the other MCs after this album, resulting in his leaving the group.  In the documentary Cydeways: The Best of the Pharcyde, while the group is performing in shows they still offer their support to Fatlip, telling the crowd that if they support Fatlip on his solo career then they support The Pharcyde and vice versa.

1997–2000
The group was largely missing from the hip hop scene between 1997 and 1999. The three remaining members returned in 2000 with an EP titled Chapter One: Testing the Waters.

The group released a full studio album later in 2000 titled Plain Rap. The album had a lukewarm reception both critically and commercially.

Soon after the release, member Slimkid3, now going by his birth name of Tre Hardson, left the group to pursue a solo career. In 2002, he released his first solo album titled Liberation.

2001–2004: Humboldt Beginnings
With only two members remaining, Bootie Brown and Imani continued with the group name and released Humboldt Beginnings in 2004. The album received even less attention critically and commercially than their last effort. This album introduced Schmooche Cat and Spaceboy Boogie X as new members and Spaceboy Boogie X as producer to the group.

The album was released on the group's own independent record label, Chapter One Entertainment.

Touring

Though Humboldt Beginnings is to date the last Pharcyde album, its members have since been keeping busy with various contributions and projects. A compilation of The Pharcyde was released in 2005, titled Sold My Soul: The Remix & Rarity Collection, featuring a number of remixes and rare songs.  Former member Fatlip released his solo debut in 2005, titled The Loneliest Punk, and Tre Hardson's second full-length solo album SLIMKID3's Cafe was released on April 4, 2006.

In late 2007, Tre toured with L.A. Latin-funk-hip hop band Ozomatli on their Winter Tour throughout the United States.

The Pharcyde and Souls of Mischief collaborated to form a group called "Almyghty Myghty Pythons" and released a collaboration album entitled Almyghty Myghty Pythons. Production from the group died down, but it was said by Imani in an interview that it was to be an ongoing project.

Fatlip and Tre Hardson reunited to perform on 'The Over 30, Dirty Old Men Tour'. Fatlip and Tre Hardson were featured on the song "All I Want for Christmas (Is Somebody Else)" featuring St. Imey (formerly of The Wascals) and produced by J-Swift on Delicious Vinyl records.

In 2005, Bootie Brown made a guest appearance on Gorillaz' single "Dirty Harry", from the album Demon Days. He has toured off and on with Gorillaz ever since, sometimes also filling in live for Mos Def on the Gorillaz' song "Stylo". In 2022, he appeared on a second song with the band, titled "New Gold" alongside Tame Impala.

On April 22, 2008 it was announced that The Pharcyde would be reuniting for the annual Rock the Bells Festival Series. The first performance was Saturday, July 19 in Chicago.

Remixes of The Pharcyde's "Runnin and "Passin' Me By" appear on Delicious Vinyl's 2008 release, Rmxxology.

The Pharcyde toured Australia in February 2009 as part of the Good Vibrations Festival, which was headlined by Fatboy Slim, and played in Sydney, Melbourne, Gold Coast and Perth.  They also headlined at the All Points West Festival in Liberty State Park, NJ on July 31, 2009.

The Pharcyde also reunited at Rhymesayers Entertainment's soundset, Memorial Day Weekend, 2009, and were the co-headliners of the festival, which was also headlined by Atmosphere and featured many other underground artists.

Uncle Imani went on FIVE10 Radio to talk about the story behind the growth and demise of The Pharcyde.

The downfall of The Pharcyde was named the 26th (out of 30) worst fall-offs in hip hop history by Complex magazine in December 2012.

2012 saw the twentieth anniversary of The Pharcyde's debut Bizarre Ride II The Pharcyde, and to mark the event Fatlip and SlimKid3 teamed up with the album's producers, J-Sw!ft and L.A. Jay, as well as record label Delicious Vinyl, to play the album in its entirety at a tribute show at The Roxy Theatre in Los Angeles. The performance was intended to be a one-off, but due to an overwhelming success and reception, the group began touring the show 'Bizarre Ride Live', and, along with MC K-Natural, working on original music under the moniker The Bizarre Ride. In December of that year, The Pharcyde released the Amerigo Gazaway-produced "Still Got Love (Bizarre Tribe Megamix)" garnering significant praise. 2015 marked the twentieth anniversary of Labcabincalifornia, resulting in a similar tour through Europe and Japan. The group continued touring Europe through 2017.

In 2022 IMANI, Slimkid3 and Fatlip launched a "30th Anniversary of Bizarre Ride" tour performing as The Far Side (Formerly of The Pharcyde).

Current
In 2020, DUBCNN reported that there would be a reunion of all four members of Pharcyde on Fatlip's upcoming album Torpor, with two Pharcyde tracks confirmed. The single, titled “My Bad”, was released on August 1 2022. “Torpor” was officially released via bandcamp on July 29, 2022 on CD and February 3rd, 2023 on vinyl. Although they have recorded new music, an entire album has yet to be confirmed.

Discography

Studio albums

Compilations

EPs

Singles

Music videos

Further reading
Coleman, Brian (2007). Check the Technique: Liner Notes for Hip-Hop Junkies. Random House, .
Edwards, Paul (2009). How to Rap: The Art & Science of the Hip-Hop MC. Chicago Review Press, .

Notes

References

External links
The Pharcyde
The Far Side

Hip hop groups from California
Delicious Vinyl artists
Musical groups from Los Angeles
African-American musical groups
Musical quartets
Alternative hip hop groups